Leinster League Division Two is the second division of Rugby in the Leinster League and started in the 1994/95 season.

History 
Kilkenny, Seapoint, Curragh, Drogheda, Roscrea, North Kildare, Athy, Gorey, Longford, Edenderry and Tullamore entered the division through the qualifying matches in the 1993/1994 season.

Curragh later amalgamated with Old Kilcullen RFC to form Newbridge and Drogheda with Delvin RFC to form Boyne.

2008/2009 season
Arklow
Ashbourne
Clane
Clondalkin
Coolmine
Edenderry
Gorey
Kilkenny
Longford
Mullingar
New Ross
Portarlington
Rathdrum
Roscrea

2008/2009 table

2007/2008 season
 Coolmine
 Edenderry
 Enniscorthy
 Kilkenny
 Longford
 Mullingar
 New Ross
 Newbridge
 Portarlington
 Railway Union
 Roscrea
 Tullow

At the end of the season, Railway Union were relegated to Division Three, Ashbourne were relegated from Division One, Arklow, Clane, Clondalkin, Gorey and Rathdrum were promoted from Division Three and Enniscorthy, Newbridge and Tullow were promoted to Division One, making it 14 teams once again for 2008/2009.

2007/2008 table

2006/2007 season
 Ashbourne
 Athy
 Coolmine
 Edenderry
 New Ross
 Newbridge
 North Kildare
 Portarlington
 Railway Union
 Roscrea
 Wicklow

At the end of the season, Athy and North Kildare were relegated to Division Three, Enniscorthy, Kilkenny and Mullingar dropped down from Division One and Tullow and Longford were promoted from Division Three. Ashbourne and Wicklow won promotion to Division One.

2006/2007 table

Past winners 
1994/1995 Seapoint

1995/1996 Tullamore

1996/1997 Barnhall

1997/1998 Ashbourne

1998/1999 Coolmine RFC

1999/2000 Garda

2000/2001 Arklow

2001/2002 Boyne

2002/2003 Seapoint

2003/2004 Portarlington

2004/2005 Mullingar

2005/2006 Dundalk

2006/2007 Ashbourne

2007/2008 Newbridge

2008/2009 Coolmine RFC

Wins by club
 Coolmine RFC (twice)
 Seapoint (twice)
 Ashbourne (twice)
 Tullamore (once)
 Barnhall (once)
 Garda (once)
 Arklow (once)
 Boyne (once)
 Portarlington (once)
 Dundalk (once)
 Newbridge (once)

External links
Leinster Rugby : Leinster League History: Division Two
Leinster League Division Two 2008/2009
Leinster League Division Two 2007/2008
Leinster League Division Two 2006/2007

Leinster League